The Baileys Harbor Town Hall-McArdle Library is located in Baileys Harbor, Wisconsin. It was added to the National Register of Historic Places in 2000.

History
The town hall was opened in the 1930s. In 1938, the library was established after Michael W. McArdle left the money in his will to start up a library in the town. Additionally, the building houses a kitchen, an auditorium, and the town clerk's office.

References

Government buildings on the National Register of Historic Places in Wisconsin
Public libraries in Wisconsin
Buildings and structures in Door County, Wisconsin
Colonial Revival architecture in Wisconsin
Libraries on the National Register of Historic Places in Wisconsin
National Register of Historic Places in Door County, Wisconsin